"Mister Garfield" is a traditional song sometimes credited to Ramblin' Jack Elliott.

Content
The song talks about the assassination of U.S. President James A. Garfield by Charles Guiteau at the Baltimore and Potomac Railroad Station in Washington on July 2, 1881.

Johnny Cash version
Johnny Cash recorded it on Columbia Records for his 1965 double album Johnny Cash Sings the Ballads of the True West.

Released in June 1965 as the first and only single from the yet-to-be-released album (Columbia 4-43313, with "The Streets of Laredo" on the opposite side), it reached number 15 on the U.S. Billboard country chart and number 17 on the Cash Box country chart.

Later Cash sang the song on his album America (1972).

Background and lyrical analysis

Track listing

Charts

References

External links 
 "Mister Garfield" (1972 ver.) on the Johnny Cash official website

Johnny Cash songs
1965 singles
Columbia Records singles

American country music songs
American folk songs
Songs about crime
Songs about presidents of the United States
Cultural depictions of James A. Garfield